Caldron Pool is an Australian Christian conservative news website, launched in October 2017 by Ben Davis. Caldron Pool is named after a lake in the fictional land of Narnia.

According to Media Matters for America, Caldron Pool is one of a number of news sites who have "obsessively reported on trans athletes", and has labelled it as an anti-LGBT right-wing media.

References

External links
 
Conservative media
News websites
Internet properties established in 2017